The Pontifical Swiss Guard (also Papal Swiss Guard or simply Swiss Guard; ; ; ;) is an armed force and honour guard unit maintained by the Holy See that protects the Pope and the Apostolic Palace within the territory of the Vatican City. Established in 1506 under Pope Julius II, the Pontifical Swiss Guard is among the oldest military units in continuous operation.

The dress uniform is of blue, red, orange and yellow with a distinctly Renaissance appearance. The Swiss Guard are equipped with traditional weapons, such as the halberd, as well as with modern firearms. Since the assassination attempt on Pope John Paul II in 1981, a much stronger emphasis has been placed on the Guard's non-ceremonial roles, and has seen enhanced training in unarmed combat and small arms.

Recruits to the guards must be unmarried Swiss Catholic males between 18 and 30 years of age who have completed basic training with the Swiss Armed Forces. 

The unit's security mission is complemented by the Corps of Gendarmerie of Vatican City.

History

Italian wars 

The Pontifical Swiss Guard has its origins in the 15th century. Pope Sixtus IV (1471–1484) had already made an alliance with the Swiss Confederacy and built barracks in Via Pellegrino after foreseeing the possibility of recruiting Swiss mercenaries. The pact was renewed by Pope Innocent VIII (1484–1492) in order to use Swiss troops against the Duke of Milan. Alexander VI (1492–1503) later actually used the Swiss mercenaries during their alliance with the King of France. During the time of the Borgias, however, the Italian Wars began in which the Swiss mercenaries were a fixture in the front lines among the warring factions, sometimes for France and sometimes for the Holy See or the Holy Roman Empire. The mercenaries enlisted when they heard King Charles VIII of France was going to war with Naples. Among the participants in the war against Naples was Cardinal Giuliano della Rovere, the future Pope Julius II (1503–1513), who was well acquainted with the Swiss, having been Bishop of Lausanne years earlier.

The expedition failed, in part thanks to new alliances made by Alexander VI against the French. When Cardinal della Rovere became Pope Julius II in 1503, he asked the Swiss Diet to provide him with a constant corps of 200 Swiss mercenaries. This was made possible through financing by German merchants from Augsburg, Ulrich and Jacob Fugger, who had invested in the Pope and saw fit to protect their investment.

In September 1505, the first contingent of 150 soldiers set off on march to Rome, under the command of Kaspar von Silenen, and entered the city on 22 January 1506, now regarded as the official date of the Guard's foundation.

"The Swiss see the sad situation of the Church of God, Mother of Christianity, and realize how grave and dangerous it is that any tyrant, avid for wealth, can assault with impunity, the common Mother of Christianity," declared the Swiss Huldrych Zwingli, who later became a Protestant reformer. Pope Julius II later granted the Guard the title "Defenders of the Church's freedom".

The force has varied greatly in size over the years and on occasion has been disbanded and reconstituted. Its most significant hostile engagement was on 6 May 1527, when 147 of the 189 Guards, including their commander Caspar Röist, died fighting the troops of Holy Roman Emperor Charles V in the stand of the Swiss Guard during the Sack of Rome in order to allow Clement VII to escape through the Passetto di Borgo, escorted by the other 42 guards. The last stand battlefield is located on the left side of St Peter's Basilica, close to the Campo Santo Teutonico (German Graveyard).  Clement VII was forced to replace the depleted Swiss Guard by a contingent of 200 German mercenaries (Custodia Peditum Germanorum). Ten years later, Pope Paul III ordered the Swiss Guard to be reinstated and sent Cardinal Ennio Filonardi to oversee recruitment. Anti-papal sentiment in Switzerland, however, stymied recruitment and it was not until 1548 that the papacy reached an agreement with mayor of Lucern, Nikolaus von Meggen, to swear-in 150 new Swiss Guardsmen under commander Jost von Meggen, the mayor's nephew.

Early modern history

After the end of the Italian Wars, the Swiss Guard ceased to be used as a military combat unit in the service of the Pope and its role became mostly that of the protection of the person of the Pope and of an honour guard.
However, twelve members of the Pontifical Swiss Guard of Pius V served as part of the Swiss Guard of admiral Marcantonio Colonna at the Battle of Lepanto in 1571.

The office of commander of the Papal Guard came to be a special honour in the Catholic region of the Swiss Confederacy. It became strongly associated with the leading family of Lucerne, Pfyffer von Altishofen, a family which between 1652 and 1847 provided nine out of a total of ten of the commanders (the exception being Johann Kaspar Mayr von Baldegg, also of Lucerne, served 1696–1704).

In 1798, commander Franz Alois Pfyffer von Altishofen went into exile with the deposed Pius VI. After the death of the Pope on 29 August 1799, the Swiss Guard was disbanded and only reinstated by Pius VII in 1800. In 1809, Rome was again captured by the French and the guard was again disbanded. Pius VII was exiled to Fontainebleau. The guard was reinstated in 1814, when the Pope returned from exile, under the previous commander Karl Leodegar Pfyffer von Altishofen.

Modern history 
The guard was disbanded yet again in 1848, when Pius IX fled to Gaeta, but was reinstated when the Pope returned to Rome the following year.

After the Piedmontese invasion of Rome, the Swiss Guard declined in the later 19th century into a purely ceremonial body with low standards. Guards on duty at the Vatican were "Swiss" only in name, mostly born in Rome to parents of Swiss descent and speaking the Roman dialect. The guards were trained solely for ceremonial parade, kept only a few obsolete rifles in store and wore civilian dress when drilling or in barracks. Administration, accommodation, discipline and organization were neglected and the unit numbered only about 90 men out of an authorized establishment of 133.

The modern Swiss Guard is the product of the reforms pursued by Jules Repond, commander during 1910–1921. Repond proposed to recruit only native citizens of Switzerland and he introduced rigorous military exercises. He also attempted to introduce modern arms, but Pius X only permitted the presence of firearms if they were not functional. Repond's reforms and strict discipline were not well received by the corps, culminating in a week of open mutiny in July 1913, and the subsequent dismissal of thirteen ringleaders from the guard.

In his project to restore the Swiss Guard to its former prestige, Repond also dedicated himself to the study of historical costume, with the aim of designing a new uniform that would be both reflective of the historical Swiss costume of the 16th century and suited for military exercise. Repond designed the distinctive Renaissance-style uniforms still worn by the modern Swiss Guard. The introduction of the new uniforms was completed in May 1914.

The foundation of Vatican City as a modern sovereign state was negotiated in the Lateran Treaty of 1929. The duties of protecting public order and security in the Vatican lay with the Papal Gendarmerie Corps, while the Swiss Guard, the Palatine Guard and the Noble Guard served mostly ceremonial functions. The Palatine and Noble Guards were disbanded by Paul VI in 1970, leaving the Swiss Guard as the only ceremonial guard unit of the Vatican. At the same time, the Gendarmerie Corps was transformed into a central security office, with the duties of protecting the Pope, defending Vatican City, and providing police and security services within its territory, while the Swiss Guard continued to serve ceremonial functions only. Paul VI in a decree of 28 June 1976 defined the nominal size of the corps at 90 men. This was increased to 100 men by John Paul II on 5 April 1979. As of 2010 the guard numbered 107 halberdiers divided into three squads, with commissioned and non-commissioned officers.

Since the assassination attempt on John Paul II of 13 May 1981, a much stronger emphasis has been placed on the guard's non-ceremonial roles. The Swiss Guard has developed into a modern guard corps equipped with modern small arms, and members of the Swiss Guard in plain clothes now accompany the Pope on his travels abroad for his protection.

On 4 May 1998 commander Alois Estermann was murdered on the day of his promotion. Estermann and his wife, Gladys Meza Romero, were killed by the young guardsman Cédric Tornay, who later committed suicide. The case received considerable public attention and became the subject of a number of conspiracy theories alleging Cold War politics or involvement by the Opus Dei prelature. British journalist John Follain, who published a book on the case in 2006, concluded that the killer acted purely out of personal motives.

On the occasion of the 500th anniversary of the Swiss Guard, in April–May 2006, 80 former guardsmen marched from Bellinzona in southern Switzerland to Rome, recalling the march of the original 200 Swiss guards to take up Papal service, in 1505. The march had been preceded by other celebrations in Lucerne, including a rally of veterans of the Guard and a Mass. In a public ceremony on 6 May 2006, 33 new guards were sworn in on the steps of St. Peter's Basilica instead of the traditional venue in the San Damaso Courtyard. The date chosen marked the anniversary of the Sack of Rome when the Swiss Guard had been nearly destroyed. Present at this event were representatives of the Company of Pikemen and Musketeers of the Honourable Artillery Company of London and the Ancient and Honorable Artillery Company of Massachusetts.

In December 2014, Pope Francis directed that Daniel Anrig's term as commander should end on 31 January 2015, and that he be succeeded by his deputy Christoph Graf. This followed reports about Anrig's "authoritarian style".

With the rise of Islamic terrorism in Europe and open threats against the Vatican issued by the Islamic State (ISIS), Vatican officials in 2015 collaborated with Italian authorities to improve the protection of Vatican City against attacks that cannot be reasonably defended against by the Swiss Guard and Vatican gendarms, notably against drone attacks.

In October 2019 the Swiss Guard reached a total personnel of 135. It is the result of the expansion of the Corps announced at the press conference held on the occasion of the swearing in of the new guards in 2018. Previously, according to article 7 of the regulation, the Swiss Guard was made up of 110 men.

Recruitment and service

Recruits to the guards must be Catholic, single males with Swiss citizenship who have completed basic training with the Swiss Armed Forces and can obtain certificates of good conduct. In 2009, the Pontifical Swiss Guard commandant, Daniel Anrig, suggested that the Guard might someday be open to recruiting women, but he added that the admission of female recruits remained far in the future. Guards are permitted to marry after five years of service.

Qualified candidates must apply to serve. If accepted, new guards are sworn in on 6 May every year in the San Damaso Courtyard in the Vatican (6 May is the anniversary of the Sack of Rome). The chaplain of the guard reads aloud the oath in the languages of the guard (German, Italian, and French):

When his name is called, each new guard approaches the Pontifical Swiss Guard's flag, grasping the banner in his left hand. He raises his right hand with his thumb, index, and middle finger extended along three axes, a gesture that symbolizes the Holy Trinity and the Rütlischwur, and swears in his native tongue (which may be any of the three official languages of Switzerland):

Those who are accepted serve for a minimum of two years. Regular guardsmen (halberdiers) receive a tax-free salary of EUR 1,300 per month (as of 2015) plus extra pay for hours worked overtime. In addition, accommodation and board are provided. Members of the guard are eligible for pontifical decorations. The Benemerenti medal is usually awarded after three years of faithful service.

Uniforms

The official full dress uniform is of blue, red, orange and yellow with a distinctly Renaissance appearance. It was introduced by commandant Jules Repond (1910–1921) in 1914.
Repond's design was inspired by 16th-century depictions of the Swiss Guard.

A clear expression of the modern Pontifical Swiss Guard uniform can be seen in a 1577 fresco by Jacopo Coppi of the Empress Eudoxia conversing with Pope Sixtus III. It shows the precursor of today's recognisable three-colored uniform with boot covers, white gloves, a high or ruff collar, and either a black beret or a black Comb morion (silver for high occasions). Sergeants wear a black top with crimson leggings, while other officers wear an all-crimson uniform.

The colors blue and yellow were in use from the 16th century, said to be chosen to represent the Della Rovere coat of arms of Julius II, with the color red added to represent the Medici coat of arms of Leo X.

The ordinary guardsmen and the sub-corporals wear the "tricolor" (yellow, blue and red) uniform without any rank distinctions except for a different model of halberd in gala dress. The corporals have red braid insignia on their cuffs and use a different, more spear-like, halberd.

Headwear is typically a large black beret for daily duties, while a black or silver morion helmet with red, white, yellow, black, and purple ostrich feathers is worn for ceremonial duties, the former for guard duty or drill; the latter for high ceremonial occasions such as the annual swearing-in ceremony or reception of foreign heads of state. Historically brightly colored pheasant or heron feathers were used. The senior non-commissioned and warrant officers have a different type of uniform. All sergeants have essentially the same pattern of dress as ordinary guardsmen, but with black tunics and red breeches. Each sergeant has a red plume on his helmet, except for the sergeant major, who displays distinctive white feathers. When the gala uniform is worn, sergeants have a different pattern of armor with a gold cord across the chest.

The commissioned officers (captains, major, vice-commander and commander) are distinguished by a completely red uniform with a different style of breeches, and golden embroidery on the sleeves. They have a longer sword, which is used when commanding a group or a squadron of guards. In gala dress all ranks use a bigger purple plume on their helmets, except for the commander, who has a white one. Usually the commander and the chief of staff (usually the vice-commander) use armor when present at gala ceremonies. On such occasions "armor complete" – including sleeve armor, is worn. Except for ceremonial occasions and exercises, officers of the guard wear civilian dress when on duty.

The tailors of the Swiss Guard work inside the Vatican barracks. There the uniform for each guardsman is tailor-made individually. The total set of Renaissance style clothing weighs , and may be the heaviest and most complicated uniform in use by any standing army today. A single uniform requires 154 pieces and takes nearly 32 hours and 3 fittings to complete.

The modern regular duty service dress uniform is more functional, consisting of a simpler solid blue version of the more colorful tricolor grand gala uniform, worn with a simple brown belt, a flat white collar and a black beret. For new recruits and rifle practice, a simple light blue overall with a brown belt may be worn. During cold or inclement weather, a dark blue cape is worn over the regular uniform.

In 2019, after more than 500 years, the Swiss Guard replaced its traditional metal helmet with a new version made of PVC, with hidden air vents. The new PVC helmet requires just one day to produce, compared to several days for the metal model.

Equipment 

The eponymous main weapon of the halbardiers is the halberd; corporals and vice-corporals are equipped with a partisan polearm. Ranks above corporal do not have polearms, but on certain ceremonial occasions carry command batons.

The banner is escorted by two flamberge great swords carried by corporals or vice-corporals. A dress sword is carried by all ranks, swords with a simple S-shaped crossguard by the lower ranks, and elaborate basket-hilt rapiers in the early baroque style by officers.

The  also contains a collection of historical weapons no longer in use.

The armory holds a collection of historical plate armor (cuirasses or half-armor). The oldest specimens date to c. 1580, while the majority originates in the 18th century. Historical armor was worn on the occasion of canonizations until 1970, since when their use has been limited to the oath ceremony on 6 May. The cuirasses are handmade, and the production of a single piece takes about 120 hours. The replicas are not financed by the Vatican itself but by private donations via the Foundation for the Swiss Guard in the Vatican, a Fribourg-based organisation established in 2000.

The Swiss Guard in their function as bodyguards are equipped with the SIG Sauer P220 pistol and the SIG SG 550 assault rifle (or its SG 552 variant) also in use by the Swiss Army. As recruits to the Swiss Guard must have undergone basic military training in Switzerland, they are already familiar with these weapons when they begin their service. The pepper spray used by the Swiss Army (RSG-2000) is also in use. The Glock 19 pistol and Heckler & Koch MP7 submachine gun are reportedly also carried by Swiss Guard members in their function as plainclothes bodyguards.

In the 19th century (prior to 1870), the Swiss Guard along with the Papal Army used firearms with special calibres such as the 12.7 mm Remington Papal. The Swiss Guard historically also used the M1842 T.59–67, 1871 Vetterli, Schmidt-Rubin, Gewehr 98, K31, and SIG SG 510 rifles, the Dreyse M1907 pistol, and the SIG MKMO, Hispano-Suiza MP43/44 and Heckler & Koch MP5 submachine guns.

Ranks and insignia 
 Commissioned officers
 (Colonel – the commandant of the Guard)
 (Lieutenant Colonel – the vice-commandant)
 (Chaplain – considered the same rank as a lieutenant colonel)

 (Captain)
 (Lieutenant, new rank introduced with promotions on 1 December 2020)

 Non-commissioned officers
 (Sergeant-major)
 (Sergeant)
 (Corporal)
 (Vice-corporal; lance corporal)

 Enlisted
/ (Halbardier/Guardsman)

Table of shoulder marks worn by officers.

Table of sleeve insignia worn by other ranks.

Banner 

The design of the banner of the Pontifical Swiss Guard banner has been changed several times. A fresco by Polidoro da Caravaggio in the burial chapel of the guard in Santa Maria della Pietà in Campo Santo Teutonico, commissioned by the second commander, Marx Röist, in 1522, depicts the commander of the guard flanked by two banners.
An early reference to the guard's banner (vennly) dates to 1519, although the design of that banner is unknown. An early surviving banner is on display in the Sala Regia. The banner would change with each pontificate, and depict the colors of the coat of arms of the reigning pope. The modern colors of the Swiss Guard, introduced in the early 20th century, are those of the House of Medici, first used under the Medici popes and depicted in a fresco by Giuseppe Porta (1520–1575).
Under Pius IX (Mastai Ferretti, r. 1846–1878), it was divided into three horizontal fields, displaying the coat of arms of the Holy See (keys in saltire surmounted by the papal tiara on a red field), the Swiss flag (a white cross with two laurel branches on a red field) and a yellow field without heraldic charge.
On the reverse side of the banner was the papal coat of arms of Pius IX. Under Pius X (Giuseppe Melchiorre, r. 1903–1914) and commander 
Leopold Meyer von Schauensee (1901–1910), the top field displayed the papal coat of arms in a blue field, in the center field was red without heraldic charge and the bottom field displayed the family coat of arms of the guard commander.

The modern design of the banner was first used under commander Jules Repond of Freiburg (1910–1921).
The modern banner is a square divided by a white cross into quarters (in the tradition of the banners historically used by the Swiss Guards in the 18th century). In the fourth quarter (lower right) is Pope Julius II's coat of arms; in the first quarter (upper left) that of the reigning pope. The other two quarters display the Swiss Guard's colors (red, yellow and blue, the colors of the House of Medici), and in the center of the cross is the commander's own coat of arms. 
The current banner thus shows the coat of arms of Pope Francis in the first quarter and a vignette of the family coat of arms of Christoph Graf in the center. It has dimensions of 2.2 m squared, woven in a damask pattern of pomegranates and thistles, in what is known as "Julius-damask" based on the Julius banners of 1512. The central vignette is embroidered on the backdrop of the colors of the flag of Lucerne. The guard colors in the second quarter (upper right) were reversed so that the second and third quarters are identical. The banner was completed in April 2015, and it was first used for the oath of service of new recruits on 6 May 2015.

Even though the banner is carried out during ceremonies and the Urbi et Orbi address and blessing twice a year, during the current pontificate of Pope Francis, only the Flag of Vatican City is used instead of the banner during ceremonial occasions as a sort of national color whenever the Pope is present.

See also 

 Corps of Gendarmerie of Vatican City
 Corsican Guard
 List of commanders of the Pontifical Swiss Guard
 Military in Vatican City
 Noble Guard (Vatican)
 Palatine Guard
 Papal Army
 Papal Zouaves
 Swiss Guards
 Swiss mercenaries

Citations

General and cited sources

External links 

 Official website: English; 
 The Vatican's Official Swiss Guard site
 Pontifical Swiss Guard, Commission or Committee of the Roman (CuriaGCatholic.org)
 Five Hundred Years of Loyalty (catholicism.org)
 Insignia of Rank (officers and other ranks) Pontifical Swiss Guard (uniforminsignia.com)

 
1506 establishments in the Papal States
Military units and formations established in the 16th century
Pope Julius II